Chicago (minor planet designation: 334 Chicago) is a very large main-belt asteroid. It is classified as a C-type asteroid and is probably composed of carbonaceous material.

It was discovered by Max Wolf on August 23, 1892, in Heidelberg.

During 1999, the asteroid was observed occulting a star. The resulting chords provided a cross-section diameter estimate of 174.1 km.

References

External links 
 
 

000334
Discoveries by Max Wolf
Named minor planets
000334
18920823